Henry Phipps John Woodward (4 April 1898 – 3 April 1966) was an Australian politician and a member of the New South Wales Legislative Assembly for a single term between 1944 and 1947. He was a member of the Labor Party.

Early life
Woodward was born in Brent Knoll in Somerset, England and was the son of a General dealer (Rag and bone man). He was educated to elementary level in England and initially worked with his father but later became a produce agent and farmer in East Brent. Woodward migrated to Australia in 1922 and was a farm produce agent and company director. He sat in parliament as a member of the Labor Party but joined the Liberal Party after leaving office.

State Parliament
Woodward entered parliament as the Labor member for Lane Cove after he won the seat at 1944 state election. This was a surprise result as Lane Cove was considered one of the most conservative seats in the assembly. The incumbent Democratic Party member Herbert FitzSimons had retired and his party's new candidate was John Cramer a future Liberal member of the Australian House of Representatives and a cabinet minister under Robert Menzies. The Liberal Democrat candidate was Norman Thomas a former United Australia Party member for the seat of Bondi.  Divisions between the two conservative parties resulted in Woodward gaining a 23% leakage of Thomas' second preferences and an 800-vote (2%) victory. The unification of New South Wales' urban conservative politicians in the Liberal Party in 1945, augured the end of Woodward's parliamentary career. He was easily defeated by Liberal candidate Ken McCaw at the 1947 election. Woodward did not hold caucus, parliamentary or ministerial office.

References

 

1898 births
1966 deaths
Members of the New South Wales Legislative Assembly
Australian Labor Party members of the Parliament of New South Wales
20th-century Australian politicians